In game theory a max-dominated strategy is a strategy which is not a best response to any strategy profile of the other players. This is an extension to the notion of strictly dominated strategies, which are max-dominated as well.

Definition

Max-dominated strategies
A strategy  of player  is max-dominated if for every strategy profile of the other players
 there is a strategy  such that .

Even if  is strictly dominated by a mixed strategy it is also max-dominated.

Weakly max-dominated strategies
A strategy  of player  is weakly max-dominated if for every strategy profile of the other players  there is a strategy  such that .

Even if  is weakly dominated by a mixed strategy it is also weakly max-dominated.

Max-solvable games

Definition
A game  is said to be max-solvable if by iterated elimination of max-dominated strategies only one strategy profile is left at the end.

More formally we say that  is max-solvable if there exists a sequence of games  such that:
 

As in the previous part one can define respectively the notion of weakly max-solvable games, which are games for which a game with a single strategy profile can be reached by eliminating weakly max-dominated strategies. The main difference would be that weakly max-dominated games may have more than one pure Nash equilibrium, and that the order of elimination might result in different Nash equilibria.

Example

The prisoner's dilemma is an example of a max-solvable game (as it is also dominance solvable). The strategy cooperate is max-dominated by the strategy defect for both players, since playing defect always gives the player a higher utility, no matter what the other player plays. To see this note that if the row player plays cooperate then the column player would prefer playing defect and go free than playing cooperate and serving one year in jail. If the row player plays defect then the column player would prefer playing defect and serve three years in jail rather than playing cooperate and serving five years in jail.

Max-solvable games and best-reply dynamics
In any max-solvable game, best-reply dynamics ultimately leads to the unique pure Nash equilibrium of the game. In order to see this, all we need to do is notice that if  is an elimination sequence of the game (meaning that first  is eliminated from the strategy space of some player since it is max-dominated, then  is eliminated, and so on), then in the best-response dynamics  will be never played by its player after one iteration of best responses,  will never be played by its player after two iterations of best responses and so on. The reason for this is that  is not a best response to any strategy profile of the other players  so after one iteration of best responses its player must have chosen a different strategy.

It may come by surprise then that weakly max-solvable games do not necessarily converge to a pure Nash equilibrium when using the best-reply dynamics, as can be seen in the game on the right. If the game starts of the bottom left cell of the matrix, then the following best replay dynamics is possible: the row player moves one row up to the center row, the column player moves to the right column, the row player moves back to the bottom row, the column player moves back to the left column and so on. This obviously never converges to the unique pure Nash equilibrium of the game (which is the upper left cell in the payoff matrix).

See also
Dominance (game theory)

External links and references
 . Asynchronous best-reply dynamics. .

Game theory